Makar Island (Остров Макар) is an island in the Sakha Republic (Yakutia), Russian Federation. It is part of the Yana Bay of the Laptev Sea.

There is a Russian Polar station on the island. In 1985 bison bones from the Pleistocene were collected by Yu. A. Yarlykov on Makar Island.

Geography
The island is flat and marshy. It has some small lakes and a landspit pointing towards the east. This island, like Muostakh Island further west in the Buor-Khaya Gulf, is subject to heavy erosion.

The Yana Bay area is subject to severe Arctic weather with frequent gales and blizzards. The sea in the bay is frozen with thick ice for about eight months every year.

See also
List of islands of Russia
List of research stations in the Arctic

References

External links
Geographical data
Location
Comparative Shoreface Evolution along the Laptev Sea Coast
Pictures of Makar Island
Pictures of the Makar Island Polar Station

Islands of the Laptev Sea
Islands of the Sakha Republic